Michael Grant Harriman (born 23 October 1992) is a former professional footballer who plays as a defender for Southern League Premier Division Central club AFC Rushden & Diamonds. He is currently Head of Player Care at Peterborough United academy.

Career

Queens Park Rangers
Harriman made his professional debut on 23 August 2011 after being introduced as a 31st-minute substitute for Bradley Orr in a 2–0 defeat at home to Rochdale in the League Cup second round. This was followed by his Premier League debut four days later in a 2–0 defeat away to Wigan Athletic, coming on as a 61st-minute substitute for Fitz Hall.

On 10 November 2011, Harriman was loaned to Southern League Premier Division club St Albans City for one month. He made his debut for St Albans two days later in a 4–1 win at home to Evesham United, in which he assisted two goals from Paul Furlong. Harriman finished the loan with 10 appearances.

He signed for League Two club Wycombe Wanderers on a one-month youth loan on 1 January 2013, making his debut later that day as a 78th-minute substitute in a 1–0 defeat at home to Exeter City. Harriman's loan was extended on 29 January until the end of 2012–13, which he finished with 20 appearances.

Harriman joined League One club Gillingham on 5 August 2013 on a 28-day emergency loan, which would be extended until January 2014. The loan was extended until the end of the season on 7 January 2014, having made 24 appearances up to that point in 2013–14. Harriman scored his first professional goal in a 2–0 win at home to Swindon Town on 18 January and completed the loan spell with one goal from 37 appearances.

On 9 October 2014, Harriman joined League Two club Luton Town on a 28-day emergency loan. The loan was extended for a further month on 7 November, which would be extended for a third month on 8 December. Harriman scored his first goal for Luton in a 2–1 defeat away to Cambridge United in the FA Cup third round on 3 January 2015. His loan was extended until the end of 2014–15 on 16 January. Harriman scored Luton's second goal in a 2–0 victory at home to Stevenage on 2 May, though they missed out on the play-offs to finish the season in eighth place. He completed the loan spell with 39 appearances and two goals.

Wycombe Wanderers
On 10 July 2015, Harriman rejoined Wycombe Wanderers on loan until the end of January 2016. On 6 January 2016, Harriman signed for Wycombe permanently on a three-and-a-half-year contract for an undisclosed fee. Harriman was released when his contract expired at the end of the 2018–19 season.

Northampton Town
Harriman signed for League Two club Northampton Town on 4 September 2019 on a short-term contract until January 2020. He scored his first goal for Northampton in an EFL Trophy second round tie against Portsmouth on 3 December, in which they were beaten 2–1 away. Harriman was released by the club at the end of the 2021–22 season.

Non-League
On 7 October 2022, Harriman signed for Southern League Premier Division Central club Bedford Town.

In March 2023, he joined league rivals AFC Rushden & Diamonds.

Career statistics

Honours
Northampton Town
EFL League Two play-offs: 2020

References

External links
Profile at the Northampton Town F.C. website
Profile at the Football Association of Ireland website

1992 births
Living people
Sportspeople from Chichester
Footballers from West Sussex
English footballers
Republic of Ireland association footballers
Republic of Ireland youth international footballers
Republic of Ireland under-21 international footballers
Association football defenders
Queens Park Rangers F.C. players
St Albans City F.C. players
Wycombe Wanderers F.C. players
Gillingham F.C. players
Luton Town F.C. players
Northampton Town F.C. players
Bedford Town F.C. players
AFC Rushden & Diamonds players
Premier League players
Southern Football League players
English Football League players
English people of Irish descent